is a Japanese football player who plays for NPL Victoria club Heidelberg United.

Club statistics
Updated to 25 November 2022.

1Includes J2/J3 Playoffs.

References

External links
Profile at Gunma
Profile at Oita
Profile at Machida Zelvia
Profile at Okayama
Profile at Fujieda

1992 births
Living people
People from Kamagaya
Association football people from Chiba Prefecture
Japanese footballers
J1 League players
J2 League players
J3 League players
Albirex Niigata players
Thespakusatsu Gunma players
Oita Trinita players
FC Machida Zelvia players
Fagiano Okayama players
Fujieda MYFC players
Blaublitz Akita players
Association football defenders